Virginius is an 1820 tragedy by the Irish writer James Sheridan Knowles. It was part of a crop of plays set during the Roman Republic, part of a revival of interest in the period. The original cast featured William Macready as Virginius and also included Maria Foote as Virginia, Harriet Faucit as Servia, William Abbot as Appius Claudius, Charles Connor as Caius Claudius, John Faucit as Titus, Daniel Egerton as Numitorious, Thomas Comer as Lucius, Charles Kemble as Icilius and Daniel Terry as Dentatus.

References

Bibliography
Sachs, Jonathon. Romantic Antiquity: Rome in the British Imagination, 1789-1832. OUP USA, 2010.

1820 plays
West End plays
Tragedy plays
Historical plays
Plays by James Sheridan Knowles
Plays set in ancient Rome